Tajudeen Abdul-Raheem (6 January 1961 – 25 May 2009) was the general secretary of the Pan-African Movement, director of Justice Africa, the Deputy Director of United Nations Millennium Campaign for Africa, as well as a writer for newspapers and journals across Africa.

He was born in Funtua, Nigeria in January, and died in a road accident on 25 May 2009 in Nairobi, Kenya, while on his way to the airport to catch a flight to Rwanda where he was scheduled to meet with the President of Rwanda.

Received an undergraduate degree in political science from a Bayero university, a Rhodes scholar at Oxford and PhD from the Buffalo University.

References

External links 
 He was to Africa what Che Guevara was to South America by Dimas Nkunda, The Observer, May 27, 2009
 Tajudeen Will Turn the Angels Into Pan Africanists by Nathan Byamukama, All Africa, May 31, 2009

Nigerian pan-Africanists
Anti-poverty advocates
Road incident deaths in Kenya
1961 births
2009 deaths
Nigerian human rights activists